In four-dimensional geometry, a runcinated 5-cell is a convex uniform 4-polytope, being a runcination (a 3rd order truncation, up to face-planing) of the regular 5-cell.

There are 3 unique degrees of runcinations of the 5-cell, including with permutations, truncations, and cantellations.

Runcinated 5-cell

The runcinated 5-cell or small prismatodecachoron is constructed by expanding the cells of a 5-cell radially and filling in the gaps with triangular prisms (which are the face prisms and edge figures) and tetrahedra (cells of the dual 5-cell). It consists of 10 tetrahedra and 20 triangular prisms. The 10 tetrahedra correspond with the cells of a 5-cell and its dual.

Topologically, under its highest symmetry, [[3,3,3]], there is only one geometrical form, containing 10 tetrahedra and 20 uniform triangular prisms. The rectangles are always squares because the two pairs of edges correspond to the edges of the two sets of 5 regular tetrahedra each in dual orientation, which are made equal under extended symmetry.

E. L. Elte identified it in 1912 as a semiregular polytope.

Alternative names 

 Runcinated 5-cell (Norman Johnson)
 Runcinated pentachoron
 Runcinated 4-simplex
 Expanded 5-cell/4-simplex/pentachoron
 Small prismatodecachoron (Acronym: Spid) (Jonathan Bowers)

Structure

Two of the ten tetrahedral cells meet at each vertex. The triangular prisms lie between them, joined to them by their triangular faces and to each other by their square faces. Each triangular prism is joined to its neighbouring triangular prisms in anti orientation (i.e., if edges A and B in the shared square face are joined to the triangular faces of one prism, then it is the other two edges that are joined to the triangular faces of the other prism); thus each pair of adjacent prisms, if rotated into the same hyperplane, would form a gyrobifastigium.

Dissection 
The runcinated 5-cell can be dissected by a central cuboctahedron into two tetrahedral cupola. This dissection is analogous to the 3D cuboctahedron being dissected by a central hexagon into two triangular cupola.

Images

Coordinates

The Cartesian coordinates of the vertices of an origin-centered runcinated 5-cell with edge length 2 are:

An alternate simpler set of coordinates can be made in 5-space, as 20 permutations of:
 (0,1,1,1,2)

This construction exists as one of 32 orthant facets of the runcinated 5-orthoplex.

A second construction in 5-space, from the center of a rectified 5-orthoplex is given by coordinate permutations of:
 (1,-1,0,0,0)

Root vectors 

Its 20 vertices represent the root vectors of the simple Lie group A4. It is also the vertex figure for the 5-cell honeycomb in 4-space.

Cross-sections

The maximal cross-section of the runcinated 5-cell with a 3-dimensional hyperplane is a cuboctahedron. This cross-section divides the runcinated 5-cell into two tetrahedral hypercupolae consisting of 5 tetrahedra and 10 triangular prisms each.

Projections

The tetrahedron-first orthographic projection of the runcinated 5-cell into 3-dimensional space has a cuboctahedral envelope. The structure of this projection is as follows:

 The cuboctahedral envelope is divided internally as follows:
 Four flattened tetrahedra join 4 of the triangular faces of the cuboctahedron to a central tetrahedron. These are the images of 5 of the tetrahedral cells.
 The 6 square faces of the cuboctahedron are joined to the edges of the central tetrahedron via distorted triangular prisms. These are the images of 6 of the triangular prism cells.
 The other 4 triangular faces are joined to the central tetrahedron via 4  triangular prisms (distorted by projection). These are the images of another 4 of the triangular prism cells.
 This accounts for half of the runcinated 5-cell (5 tetrahedra and 10 triangular prisms), which may be thought of as the 'northern hemisphere'.
 The other half, the 'southern hemisphere', corresponds to an isomorphic division of the cuboctahedron in dual orientation, in which the central tetrahedron is dual to the one in the first half. The triangular faces of the cuboctahedron join the triangular prisms in one hemisphere to the flattened tetrahedra in the other hemisphere, and vice versa. Thus, the southern hemisphere contains another 5 tetrahedra and another 10 triangular prisms, making the total of 10 tetrahedra and 20 triangular prisms.

Related skew polyhedron 

The regular skew polyhedron, {4,6|3}, exists in 4-space with 6 squares around each vertex, in a zig-zagging nonplanar vertex figure. These square faces can be seen on the runcinated 5-cell, using all 60 edges and 20 vertices. The 40 triangular faces of the runcinated 5-cell can be seen as removed. The dual regular skew polyhedron, {6,4|3}, is similarly related to the hexagonal faces of the bitruncated 5-cell.

Runcitruncated 5-cell

The runcitruncated 5-cell or prismatorhombated pentachoron is composed of 60 vertices, 150 edges, 120 faces, and 30 cells. The cells are: 5 truncated tetrahedra, 10 hexagonal prisms, 10 triangular prisms, and 5 cuboctahedra. Each vertex is surrounded by five cells: one truncated tetrahedron, two hexagonal prisms, one triangular prism, and one cuboctahedron; the vertex figure is a rectangular pyramid.

Alternative names 
 Runcitruncated pentachoron
 Runcitruncated 4-simplex
 Diprismatodispentachoron
 Prismatorhombated pentachoron (Acronym: prip) (Jonathan Bowers)

Images

Coordinates 

The Cartesian coordinates of an origin-centered runcitruncated 5-cell having edge length 2 are:

The vertices can be more simply constructed on a hyperplane in 5-space, as the permutations of:
 (0,1,1,2,3)

This construction is from the positive orthant facet of the runcitruncated 5-orthoplex.

Omnitruncated 5-cell

The omnitruncated 5-cell or great prismatodecachoron is composed of 120 vertices, 240 edges, 150 faces (90 squares and 60 hexagons), and 30 cells. The cells are: 10 truncated octahedra, and 20 hexagonal prisms. Each vertex is surrounded by four cells: two truncated octahedra, and two hexagonal prisms, arranged in two phyllic disphenoidal vertex figures.

Coxeter calls this Hinton's polytope after C. H. Hinton,  who described it in his book The Fourth Dimension in 1906.  It forms a uniform honeycomb which Coxeter calls Hinton's honeycomb.

Alternative names 
 Omnitruncated 5-cell
 Omnitruncated pentachoron
 Omnitruncated 4-simplex
 Great prismatodecachoron (Acronym: gippid) (Jonathan Bowers)
 Hinton's polytope (Coxeter)

Images

Perspective projections

Permutohedron 

Just as the truncated octahedron is the permutohedron of order 4, the omnitruncated 5-cell is the permutohedron of order 5.
The omnitruncated 5-cell is a zonotope, the Minkowski sum of five line segments parallel to the five lines through the origin and the five vertices of the 5-cell.

Tessellations 

The omnitruncated 5-cell honeycomb can tessellate 4-dimensional space by translational copies of this cell, each with 3 hypercells around each face. Unlike the analogous honeycomb in three dimensions, the bitruncated cubic honeycomb which has three different Coxeter group Wythoff constructions, this honeycomb has only one such construction.

Symmetry 

The omnitruncated 5-cell has extended pentachoric symmetry, order 240. The vertex figure of the omnitruncated 5-cell represents the Goursat tetrahedron of the [3,3,3] Coxeter group. The extended symmetry comes from a 2-fold rotation across the middle order-3 branch, and is represented more explicitly as [2+[3,3,3]].

Coordinates 

The Cartesian coordinates of the vertices of an origin-centered omnitruncated 5-cell having edge length 2 are:

These vertices can be more simply obtained in 5-space as the 120 permutations of (0,1,2,3,4).
This construction is from the positive orthant facet of the runcicantitruncated 5-orthoplex, t0,1,2,3{3,3,3,4}, .

Related polytopes 
Nonuniform variants with [3,3,3] symmetry and two types of truncated octahedra can be doubled by placing the two types of truncated octahedra on each other to produce a nonuniform polychoron with 10 truncated octahedra, two types of 40 hexagonal prisms (20 ditrigonal prisms and 20 ditrigonal trapezoprisms), two kinds of 90 rectangular trapezoprisms (30 with D2d symmetry and 60 with C2v symmetry), and 240 vertices. Its vertex figure is an irregular triangular bipyramid.

Vertex figureThis polychoron can then be alternated to produce another nonuniform polychoron with 10 icosahedra, two types of 40 octahedra (20 with S6 symmetry and 20 with D3 symmetry), three kinds of 210 tetrahedra (30 tetragonal disphenoids, 60 phyllic disphenoids, and 120 irregular tetrahedra), and 120 vertices. It has a symmetry of [[3,3,3]+], order 120.

Vertex figure

Full snub 5-cell 

The full snub 5-cell or omnisnub 5-cell, defined as an alternation of the omnitruncated 5-cell, cannot be made uniform, but it can be given Coxeter diagram , and symmetry +, order 120, and constructed from 90 cells: 10 icosahedrons, 20 octahedrons, and 60 tetrahedrons filling the gaps at the deleted vertices. It has 300 faces (triangles), 270 edges, and 60 vertices.

Topologically, under its highest symmetry, +, the 10 icosahedra have T (chiral tetrahedral) symmetry, while the 20 octahedra have D3 symmetry and the 60 tetrahedra have C2 symmetry.

Related polytopes 

These polytopes are a part of a family of 9 Uniform 4-polytope constructed from the [3,3,3] Coxeter group.

Notes

References 
 H.S.M. Coxeter:
 H.S.M. Coxeter, Regular Polytopes, 3rd Edition, Dover New York, 1973
 Kaleidoscopes: Selected Writings of H.S.M. Coxeter, edited by F. Arthur Sherk, Peter McMullen, Anthony C. Thompson, Asia Ivic Weiss, Wiley-Interscience Publication, 1995,  
 (Paper 22) H.S.M. Coxeter, Regular and Semi Regular Polytopes I, [Math. Zeit. 46 (1940) 380-407, MR 2,10]
 (Paper 23) H.S.M. Coxeter, Regular and Semi-Regular Polytopes II, [Math. Zeit. 188 (1985) 559-591]
 (Paper 24) H.S.M. Coxeter, Regular and Semi-Regular Polytopes III, [Math. Zeit. 200 (1988) 3-45]
 Norman Johnson Uniform Polytopes, Manuscript (1991)
 N.W. Johnson: The Theory of Uniform Polytopes and Honeycombs, Ph.D.
 
  o3x3x3o - spid, x3x3o3x - prip, x3x3x3x - gippid

4-polytopes